Maxwell Lloyd Wiltshire (16 July 1938 – 19 September 2021) was a Welsh international rugby union player. He played as a lock forward  for Aberavon RFC during the 1960s.

First capped against the touring All Blacks in 1967 along with fellow Aberavon players, Billy Mainwaring, Ian Hall and Paul James Wheeler he won four Welsh caps.

He captained Aberavon in the 1965–66 & 1966–67 seasons.

References 

1938 births
2021 deaths
Aberavon RFC players
Vardre RFC players
Bridgend RFC players
Barbarian F.C. players
Wales international rugby union players
Rugby union players from Sydney
Welsh rugby union players
Rugby union locks